Francisco de Távora (1646–31 May 1710), designated 1st Count of Alvor, was a Portuguese noble of the second half of the 17th century and early 18th century. He was a military official, diplomat, and colonial governor, serving the Kingdom of Portugal during the reign of Afonso VI of Portugal, Pedro II of Portugal, and João V of Portugal. He was the third son of the 2nd Count of São João da Pesqueira, António Luís de Távora and his wife Arcângela Maria de Portugal, daughter of the 4th Count of Linhares

Family

Born to António Luis de Távora, second count of São João da Pesqueira and D. Arcângela Maria de Portugal, he married Inês Catarina de Távora and had three children :
Maria Inácia de Távora (1678)
Bernardo António Filipe Neri de Távora, second count of Alvor (1681)
António Luis de Távora (1689).

His second marriage was with D. Isabel da Silva.

Governor of Portuguese Angola (1669–1676)
Governor of Portuguese India (56th) (1681–1686)
Vice-Roy of India (33rd) (1681–1686)
Another Francisco de Távora commanded the Great King during the naval battle of Diu (1509).

Sources 
http://arquivo.pt/wayback/20070929110951/http://genealogia.netopia.pt/pessoas/pes_show.php?id=4180

Governors of Portuguese Angola
Viceroys of Portuguese India
1646 births
1710 deaths
People from Lisbon
17th century in Angola
17th century in Portuguese India
17th-century Portuguese people
18th-century Portuguese people

Portuguese nobility